Homer Smith may refer to:

Homer Smith (American football) (1931–2011), American gridiron football player and coach
Homer W. Smith (1895–1962), American physiologist and science writer
Homer Smith Jr (1909–1972), American journalist and postal worker
J. Homer Smith, druggist and banker who served as the mayor of Yuma, Arizona
Homer Smith, primary character in the 1962 novel, and subsequent 1963 film Lilies of the Field